Dalto is a surname. Notable people with the surname include:

Gustavo Dalto (born 1963), Uruguayan football player and manager
Jorge Dalto (1948-1987), Argentine musician
Mauro Da Dalto (born 1981), Italian professional road bicycle racer

See also
Dalto (composer), (born 1949), stage name of Dalto Roberto Medeiros, Brazilian composer and singer
Dalto (Driebergen), a Dutch korfball club